Kochuveli - Amritsar Weekly Express is a Express train of the Indian Railways connecting Kochuveli in Kerala and Amritsar Junction of Punjab. It is currently being operated with 12483/12483 train numbers on a weekly basis. It is running with an LHB rake W.E.F. 9 June 2019. It is the only train that connects Kerala with Amritsar. From 11, July 2021 it runs with new time. As per the new timetable 12483 departs Kochuveli at 09.15 hrs on every Wednesdays and reaches Amritsar at 13.50 hrs on every Fridays. In the return direction 12484 departs Amritsar at 05.55 hrs on every Sundays and reaches Kochuveli at 12.25 hrs on every Tuesdays. During monsoon periods over Konkan route the travelling time will be changed.

Service

The 12483/Kochuveli - Amritsar Weekly SF Express has an average speed of 58 km/hr and covers 3597 km in 52 hrs 35 mins. 12484/Amritsar - Kochuveli Weekly SF Express has an average speed of 62 km/hr and covers 3597 km in 54 hrs 30 mins.

Timings & Route

From 11th July 2021 it runs with new timings. Accordingly, 12483 Kochuveli - Amritsar Superfast Express departs Kochuveli on every Wednesday at 09.15 hrs and reaches Amritsar at 13:50 hrs on every Fridays. During monsoon periods it departs Kochuveli at 04.50 hrs on every Wednesdays and reaches Amritsar every Fridays at 13.50 hrs. 

In return direction 12484 Amritsar - Kochuveli departs Amritsar at 05:55 hrs on every Sunday and reaches Kochuveli at 12:25 hrs on every Tuesdays. During monsoon periods (Over Konkan Railway) it departs Amritsar at 05.55 on every Sundays and reaches Kochuveli at 14.30 hrs on every Tuesdays. 

It runs via, Kollam Junction, Kayamkulam, Alappuzha, Ernakulam Junction, Thrissur, Shoranur Junction, Kozhikode, Kannur, Kasaragod, Mangaluru Junction, Udupi, Madgaon, Ratnagiri, Panvel, Vasai Road, Surat, Vadodara, Kota Junction, Hazrat Nizamuddin, New Delhi, Ambala Cantonment, Ludhiana, Jalandhar City and Beas.

Coach composite

The train has a modern LHB rake with an MPS of 130 kmph. The train consists of 21 coaches :

 2 AC II Tier 
 6 AC III Tier 
 7 Sleeper Class 
 4 General Unreserved
 2 End On Generator Cars (EOG)

Traction 
It runs with WAP7 of Ghaziabad Electric Loco Shed End to End

Notes

See also 

 Kochuveli railway station
 Amritsar Junction railway station
 Indore–Pune Superfast Express

References

External links 

 12483/Kochuveli - Amritsar Weekly SF Express
 12484/Amritsar - Kochuveli Weekly SF Express

Transport in Thiruvananthapuram
Transport in Amritsar
Express trains in India
Rail transport in Maharashtra
Rail transport in Karnataka
Rail transport in Goa
Rail transport in Kerala
Rail transport in Gujarat
Rail transport in Rajasthan
Rail transport in Delhi
Rail transport in Punjab, India